This is a list of British television related events from 1946.

British television broadcasts resumed this year. They had been suspended during World War II, for fear that the signals would help German bombers.

Events

January – May
No events.

June
1 June – The first television licence is introduced in the United Kingdom, costing £2.
7 June – The BBC Television Service begins broadcasting again. The first words heard are "Good afternoon everybody. How are you? Do you remember me, Jasmine Bligh?". The Mickey Mouse cartoon Mickey's Gala Premier that had been the last programme transmitted seven years earlier at the start of World War II, is reshown after Bligh's introduction.
 June – BBC Wimbledon returns. It was the longest running pre-war programme since it debuted in 1927. It brings back the longest tennis tournament after the end of World War II and the reintroduction of the BBC Television Service.

July
7 July – The BBC's children's programme For the Children returns, one of the few pre-war programmes to resume after the reintroduction of the BBC Television Service.

August
4 August – Children's puppet Muffin the Mule makes his first appearance in an episode of For The Children. He is so popular he is given his own show later in the year on a new service Watch with Mother.

September
No events.

October
 19 October – The first live televised post-war football match is broadcast by the BBC. Twenty minutes of Barnet's home game against Wealdstone were televised in the first half and thirty five minutes of the second half before it became too dark.
22 October – Telecrime, the first television crime series from the 1930s, returns for the final run on the BBC Television Service, retitled Telecrimes.

November
29 November – Pinwright's Progress, British television's first sitcom, is broadcast for the first time on the BBC Television Service.

December
31 December – The BBC ends the day's television broadcasting with Seeing the New Year In.

Debuts
5 May – Rory The Tiger and Friend (1939-1965, 1974-1981) 
7 June – The Dark Lady of the Sonnets (1946)
2 July – Jeannie (1946)
7 July – Frieda (1946)
21 July – The Shop at Sly Corner (1946)
4 August – Muffin the Mule (1946–1955, 2005–2006)
9 August – The Playboy of the Western World (1946)
20 August – The Man with the Cloak Full of Holes (1946)
27 August – The Rose and Crown (1946)
2 November – Kaleidoscope (1946–1953)
29 November – Pinwright's Progress (1946–1947)
1 December – Morning Departure (1946)
21 December – Alice (1946)
29 December – Toad of Toad Hall (1946)
Unknown – Cookery (1946–1951)

Television shows returning after the war

1920s
BBC Wimbledon (1927–1939, 1946–2019, 2021–2024)

1930s
Picture Page (1936–1939, 1946–1952)
For the Children (1937–1939, 1946–1952)
Telecrime (1938–1939, 1946)
The Boat Race (1938–1939, 1946–2019)
BBC Cricket (1939, 1946–1999, 2020–2024)

Ending this year

Telecrime (1938–1939, 1946)

Births
 1 February – Elisabeth Sladen, English actress, Doctor Who (died 2011)
 5 February – Charlotte Rampling, English actress
 7 February – Pete Postlethwaite, English actor (died 2011)
 16 February – Ian Lavender, actor
 18 February – Michael Buerk, journalist and news presenter
 20 February – Brenda Blethyn, English actress
 21 February – Alan Rickman, English actor (died 2016)
 21 March – Timothy Dalton, Welsh actor
 28 March – Tricia Ingrams, journalist and television presenter (died 1996)
 5 April – Jane Asher, actress
 11 April – Bob Harris, radio and television presenter
 18 April – Hayley Mills, actress
 19 April – Tim Curry, English actor, vocalist and composer
 May – Jock Brown, football commentator
 1 May – Joanna Lumley, actress
 10 May – Maureen Lipman, actress, columnist and comedian
 13 May – Tim Pigott-Smith, actor (died 2017)
 15 June – Noddy Holder, English singer (Slade)
 5 July – Gwyneth Powell, English actress (died 2022)
 14 July – Sue Lawley, broadcaster
 26 August – Alison Steadman, actress
 19 September – Michael Elphick, actor (died 2002)
 25 September – Felicity Kendal, actress
 28 September – Helen Shapiro, singer and actor
 29 September – Patricia Hodge, English actress
 10 October – Chris Tarrant, broadcaster and television presenter
 14 October – Katy Manning, English actress
 17 October – Vicki Hodge, English actress
 22 October – Kelvin MacKenzie, media executive
 31 October – Stephen Rea, Northern Irish actor
 18 November – Andrea Allan, Scottish actress
 20 December – Lesley Judd, English actress and television presenter
 23 December – John Sullivan, English scriptwriter (died 2011)
 27 December – Janet Street-Porter, English broadcast journalist

Deaths
 14 June – John Logie Baird, 57, engineer and inventor of the world's first working television system.

See also
 1946 in British music
 1946 in the United Kingdom
 List of British films of 1946

References